Dr Kanimozhi NVN Somu is a politician. She is a Member of Parliament, representing Tamil Nadu in the Rajya Sabha the upper house of Indian Parliament as a member of the Dravida Munnetra Kazhagam. She is the State Medical Wing Secretary and spokesperson of the party. She is a Doctor, having done her MBBS at Kilpauk Medical College and Master of Surgery (Obstetrics & Gynaecology) from the Sri Ramachandra Medical College and Research Institute. She is the founder of Thaaimai Hospital located at TTK ROAD, Alwarpet, Chennai and Thaaimai Women’s Clinic and Day Care Surgery Centre located at Gopalapuram, Chennai. She is a visiting consultant at Apollo First Med Hospitals, Apollo Cradle, Motherhood Hospitals and MGM Healthcare.

References

Living people
Year of birth missing (living people)
Dravida Munnetra Kazhagam politicians
Rajya Sabha members from Tamil Nadu
Women in Tamil Nadu politics
21st-century Indian women politicians
21st-century Indian politicians